Calhoun County is a county in the U.S. state of West Virginia. As of the 2020 census, the population was 6,229, making it the third-least populous county in West Virginia.  Its county seat is Grantsville. The county was founded in 1856 and named for South Carolina politician John C. Calhoun.

Geography

In 1863, West Virginia's counties were divided into civil townships, with the intention of encouraging local government.  This proved impractical in the heavily rural state, and in 1872 the townships were converted into magisterial districts.  Calhoun County was divided into five districts: Centre, Lee, Sheridan, Sherman, and Washington.  Between 1980 and 1990, the county was reorganized into five new magisterial districts: District 1, District 2, District 3, District 4, and District 5.

Major highways
 U.S. Highway 33/U.S. Highway 119
 West Virginia Route 5
 West Virginia Route 16

Adjacent counties
Ritchie County (north)
Gilmer County (east)
Braxton County (southeast)
Clay County (south)
Roane County (west)
Wirt County (northwest)

Demographics

2010 census
As of the 2010 United States census, there were 7,627 people, 3,268 households, and 2,178 families living in the county. The racial makeup of the county was 98.4% white, 0.3% American Indian, 0.2% black or African American, 0.2% Asian, 0.2% from other races, and 0.7% from two or more races. Those of Hispanic or Latino origin made up 0.7% of the population. In terms of ancestry, 22.4% were German, 21.3% were Irish, 7.7% were American, 7.3% were English, and 5.7% were Dutch.

Of the 3,268 households, 26.5% had children under the age of 18 living with them, 51.7% were married couples living together, 9.7% had a female householder with no husband present, 33.4% were non-families, and 28.5% of all households were made up of individuals. The average household size was 2.33 and the average family size was 2.80. The median age was 45.1 years.

The median income for a household in the county was $26,922 and the median income for a family was $34,897. Males had a median income of $32,229 versus $20,707 for females. The per capita income for the county was $17,121. About 13.2% of families and 20.5% of the population were below the poverty line, including 35.0% of those under age 18 and 6.6% of those age 65 or over.

2000 census
As of the census of 2000, there were 7,582 people, 3,071 households, and 2,201 families living in the county.  The population density was 27 people per square mile (10/km2).  There were 3,848 housing units at an average density of 14 per square mile (5/km2).  The racial makeup of the county was 98.91% White, 0.11% Black or African American, 0.30% Native American, 0.11% Asian, 0.01% Pacific Islander, 0.13% from other races, and 0.44% from two or more races.  0.55% of the population were Hispanic or Latino of any race.

There were 3,071 households, out of which 28.90% had children under the age of 18 living with them, 57.00% were married couples living together, 10.30% had a female householder with no husband present, and 28.30% were non-families. 24.90% of all households were made up of individuals, and 12.30% had someone living alone who was 65 years of age or older.  The average household size was 2.46 and the average family size was 2.91.

In the county, the population was spread out, with 22.40% under the age of 18, 8.00% from 18 to 24, 25.90% from 25 to 44, 27.10% from 45 to 64, and 16.70% who were 65 years of age or older.  The median age was 41 years. For every 100 females there were 99.70 males.  For every 100 females age 18 and over, there were 98.30 males.

The median income for a household in the county was $21,578, and the median income for a family was $26,701. Males had a median income of $25,609 versus $14,304 for females. The per capita income for the county was $11,491.  About 19.10% of families and 25.10% of the population were below the poverty line, including 29.40% of those under age 18 and 24.90% of those age 65 or over.

Politics
Calhoun County is a historically secessionist and Democratic county, which never voted Republican between the first Reconstruction election and Dwight D. Eisenhower’s landslide win in 1956. Since then it has consistently followed the statewide results of West Virginia, from Democratic-leaning to Republican bastion in the twenty-first century.

Attractions
Calhoun County is home to four public parks: The Upper West Fork Park in Chloe on West Virginia Route 16, the West Fork Park in Arnoldsburg on U.S. Route 33, Mt. Zion Park on West Virginia Route 16, and Calhoun County Park on West Virginia Route 16.

Calhoun is home to the annual West Virginia Wood Festival, the West Virginia Molasses Festival in September.

Calhoun County was home to one of the last 500 drive-in theaters in the nation, now closed.  Calhoun also has one of the largest genealogy collections in the state, housed at Calhoun County Library. The library is also home to the "West Virginia Room" which includes books on West Virginia and by West Virginians.

Communities

Town
Grantsville (county seat)

Magisterial districts
District 1
District 2
District 3
District 4
District 5

Unincorporated communities

Adam
Altizer
Annamoriah
Arnoldsburg
Ayers
Beech
Big Springs
Bigbend
Cabot Station
Chloe
Cremo
Dodrill
Douglas
Euclid
Five Forks
Freed
Hathaway
Hattie
Henrietta
Hur
Joker
Leatherbark
Liberty Hill
Millstone
Milo
Minnora
Mount Zion
Mudfork
Nicut
Nobe
Oka
Orma
Pink
Pleasant Hill
Purdy
Rhoda
Richardson
Russet
Sand Ridge
Stinson
Sycamore
White Pine

See also
The Calhoun Chronicle and The Grantsville News
National Register of Historic Places listings in Calhoun County, West Virginia
Stumptown Wildlife Management Area
USS Calhoun County (LST-519)

References

External links

General Highway Map of northern Calhoun County, prepared by WV Dept. of Transportation 
General Highway Map of southern Calhoun County, prepared by WV Dept. of Transportation 

 
1856 establishments in Virginia
Populated places established in 1856
Counties of Appalachia